The second USS Caprice (PG-90), formerly CN-308, was launched 28 September 1942, by Kingston Shipbuilding Co., Kingston, Ontario, Canada, for the United States Navy. Upon completion, Caprice was transferred to the Royal Navy on 28 May 1943, and commissioned as HMS Honesty.

On 5 January 1946, Honesty was returned to the United States Navy and reverted to the name Caprice. Never commissioned in the United States Navy, Caprice was sold on 10 December 1946.

References

External links
USS Caprice (PG-90
NavSource Online: Gunboat Photo Archive -  HMS Honesty (K 285) ex-Caprice (PG 90) ex-CN-308

World War II naval ships of the United States
Ships built in Ontario
1942 ships
Action-class gunboats
Flower-class corvettes of the Royal Navy